Twist is an American digital multicast television network owned by Tegna Inc. Launched on April 5, 2021, the network specializes in factual lifestyle and reality television content aimed at females between the ages of 25 and 54, sourcing its programs from the archives of NBCUniversal Television and Streaming, with its name coming from the common reality show "twist" in an overall narrative. The network is available in many media markets via the digital subchannels of over-the-air television stations, and on select cable and Internet Protocol television providers in certain markets through local affiliates of the network.

History 
Twist was announced on February 24, 2021. The network was given an expected launch date of April 2021. Tegna tapped several of its 46 owned or operated television stations to serve as the network's charter affiliates, in exchange for maintaining a minority ownership stake in the network.

Programming 
Twist's lineup of programming includes:
 Candice Tells All 
 Cash and Cari
 Clean House
 Clean House Comes Clean
 Dance Moms
 Decked Out
 Dr. 90210
 Fearless in the Kitchen
 Flipping Out
 For Better or for Worse
 For Rent
 It's Just Food
 My Floating Home
 Paranormal Survivor
 Queer Eye for the Straight Guy
 The Science Zone
 Tabatha Takes Over
 Tabatha's Salon Takeover
 The Unsellables
 What's For Sale?

Affiliates 
Twist is mostly affiliated with Tegna, HC2/DTV America and Univision/UniMás owned and operated stations around the country.

References

External links 

2021 establishments in Georgia (U.S. state)
Television channels and stations established in 2021
Companies based in Atlanta
Tegna Inc.
Twist (TV network)
Television networks in the United States